The Lakeview Historic District is a historic district on the north side of the city of Chicago, Illinois.

The district was listed on the U.S. National Register of Historic Places on September 15, 1977. A boundary expansion on May 16, 1986, added a one-block section on the south side of Belmont Avenue, between Orchard and Halsted Streets.

Land use in the historic district is primarily multi-family residential. Streets are laid out on a rectangular grid that is broken by the short jogs in some of the streets and crossed on the diagonal by Clark Street.

References

Historic districts in Chicago
North Side, Chicago
Chicago Landmarks
Buildings and structures on the National Register of Historic Places in Chicago
Historic districts on the National Register of Historic Places in Illinois